Karina Rodríguez may refer to:

 Karina Rodríguez (footballer) (born 1999), American-born Mexican footballer
 Karina Rodríguez (fighter) (born 1985), Mexican mixed martial artist
 Karina Rodríguez (sport shooter) (born 1979), Peruvian sport shooter